Juan Manuel Pérez Bernal (born May 5, 1985, in Tijuana), also known simply as Kichi, is a Mexican football player who played as a forward for the North County Battalion of the National Premier Soccer League in San Diego, California.

References
 
 
 Tatabanyafc.hu Profile (Hungarian)
 Noroeste.com (es)
 NC Battalion Profile

1985 births
Living people
Mexican expatriate footballers
Mexican footballers
Footballers from Baja California
Sportspeople from Tijuana
Expatriate footballers in Hungary
Expatriate soccer players in the United States
Dorados de Sinaloa footballers
FC Tatabánya players
Orange County SC players
San Diego Flash players
SoCal Surf players
Ascenso MX players
USL Championship players
National Premier Soccer League players
Association football forwards
Mexican expatriate sportspeople in Hungary